Érika Januza da Trindade Gomes (born 7 May 1985) is a Brazilian actress and model.

Early life
Érika Januza was born to the only child of a single mother. During her youth she took part in many beauty contests and acting auditions. Although she always held the aspiration to be a model and actress on television as she initially worked as a school teacher.

Film career
In 2012 Januza was chosen from 2,000 contestants to be the leading protagonists in the telenovia Suburbia directed by Luiz Fernando Carvalho and Paulo Lins. Since then she has appeared in multiple television programs, commercials and films.

Allegations of discrimination

Januza has said that early on in her career she was often looked down upon at auditions because of her Afro-Brazilian complexion and heritage. One time in her film career while arriving on set the security guards would not let her in the studio because they did not believe that she was actually part of the cast.

Filmography

Television

Film 
 2016 - O Último Animal
 2017 - The Movie of My Life as Tita

References

External links
 

1985 births
Living people
People from Contagem
Afro-Brazilian actresses
Brazilian television actresses
Brazilian film actresses
Brazilian female models